Balachandran is an Indian surname. Notable people with the surname include:

 Balachandran Chullikkadu (born 1957), Indian poet, orator, lyricist, and author
 M. Balachandran, banker
 Aiyalam Parameswaran Balachandran, Indian theoretical physicist

Surnames of Indian origin